Emiliya Alehauna Kalehanova (born 28 November 2000) is a Belarusian retired ice dancer. With her skating partner, Uladzislau Palkhouski, she is a two-time Belarusian national silver medalist (2019–20) and has competed in the final segment at two World Junior Championships (2017, 2019).

Programs 
(with Palkhouski)

Competitive highlights 
CS: Challenger Series; JGP: Junior Grand Prix

 with Palkhouski

References

External links 
 

2000 births
Belarusian female ice dancers
Living people
Figure skaters from Minsk
Sportspeople from Tashkent
Uzbekistani emigrants to Belarus
Figure skaters at the 2016 Winter Youth Olympics